Gene Pukall, (born 16 January 1975 in Berlin, Germany) is a German professional boxer fighting in the heavyweight division.

Debut
Pukall turned professional in April 2000 in the Neuruppin, Brandenburg, Germany. In his debut Pukall lost on points to Danny Oleksy over four rounds.

German title
He suffered defeat in his contest for the German heavyweight championship when he was stopped by Andreas Sidon.

WBU World Heavyweight title
Pukall became the World Boxing Union V. heavyweight World Champion on March 5, 2011 by defeating fellow German Ingo Jaede in the Hohenschoenhausen, Berlin, Germany.

References

External links
 

Living people
1975 births
German male boxers
Heavyweight boxers
Boxers from Berlin